Hypidota is a monotypic moth genus in the family Erebidae. Its only species, Hypidota neurias, is found in Brazil. Both the genus and the species were first described by William Schaus in 1904.

References

Phaegopterina
Monotypic moth genera
Moths described in 1904
Moths of South America